Events in the year 2003 in Bulgaria.

Incumbents 

 President: Georgi Parvanov
 Prime Minister: Simeon Sakskoburggotski

Events 

 29 August – A grenade launcher was fired at Bulgarian troops supporting the United States in Iraq in the second holiest Shiite city of Karbala, but there were no casualties.

References 

 
2000s in Bulgaria
Years of the 21st century in Bulgaria
Bulgaria
Bulgaria